An athlete biological passport is an individual electronic record for professional athletes, in which profiles of biological markers of doping and results of doping tests are collated over a period of time. Doping violations can be detected by noting variances from an athlete's established levels outside permissible limits, rather than testing for and identifying illegal substances.

Although the terminology athlete passport is recent, the use of biological markers of doping has a long history in anti-doping. Maybe the first marker of doping that tries to detect a prohibited substance not based on its presence in urine or blood but instead the induced deviations in biological parameters is the testosterone over epitestosterone ratio (T/E). The T/E has been used by sports authorities since the beginning of the 1980s to detect anabolic steroids in urine samples. A decade later, in 1997, markers of blood doping were introduced by some international federations, such as the Union Cycliste Internationale (UCI) and the Federation Internationale de Ski, to deter the abuse of recombinant erythropoietin that was undetectable by direct means at that time.

In 2002 the concept of using biological markers to detect doping became known by the term "athlete passport". The advantages were listed in a science journal paper. and the terminology adopted by the World Anti-Doping agency.

While a new drug test must be developed and validated for each new drug, the advantage of the athlete passport is that it is based on the natural stability of the physiology of the human being. There can be a lag of between the availability of a new drug and the development of an effective test. In contrast, the physiology of the human being remains the same through several generations and all biomarkers developed today in the athlete passport will remain valid for at least several decades. For example, the blood module of the passport is already sensitive today to any new future form of recombinant erythropoietin, as well as to any form of gene doping that will enhance oxygen transfer to the muscles. Also, while a negative drug test does not necessarily mean that the athlete did not dope, the athlete can present his/her passport at the beginning of a competition to attest that he/she will compete in his/her natural, unaltered condition.

The athlete passport was widely covered in the media when the blood module was established at the beginning of the 2008 racing season by the world cycling federation, the UCI. In May 2008 the UCI revealed that 23 riders were under suspicion of doping following the first phase of blood tests conducted under the new biological passport.

The blood module of the athlete passport aims to detect any form of blood doping, the steroid module any form of doping with anabolic steroid and the endocrine module any modification of the growth hormone/IGF-1 axis. Each of these modules are however at different steps of development, validation and application in sports.

Athlete biological passport testing 
According to the World Anti-Doping Agency, the athlete biological passport is administered to establish whether an athlete is manipulating his/her physiological variables without detecting a particular substance or method. The biological passport uses the standardized approach of urine sampling to determine steroid abuse. The objective of this testing is to identify athletes in a haematological module and a steroidal module.

The haematological module tests for certain markers in the body that identify the enhancement of oxygen transport. The specific markers the module tests for include haematocrit, haemoglobin, red blood cell count, percentage of reticulocytes, reticulocytes count, mean corpuscular volume, mean corpuscular haemoglobin, mean red cell distribution width, and immature reticulocyte fraction.

The steroidal module collects information on markers for steroid doping and aims to identify endogenous anabolic androgenic steroids. The specific markers the module tests for include testosterone, epitestosterone, the testosterone/epitestosterone ratio, androsterone, and etiocholanolone.

The World Anti-Doping Agency recently released the 2014 Prohibited Substances list and it will take effect on 1 January. In the new list, the agency modified the definitions of exogenous and endogenous steroids being tested for in the steroidal module of the biological passport.

Cycling

Whereabouts rules 

Under the new rules, registered riders have to give the Union Cycliste Internationale daily information about their location and provide a one-hour window for possible testing. They have to submit a form every quarter-year saying where they will be every day of the next quarter and they must notify the UCI if they change their whereabouts on any day. This means the whereabouts information provided in the whereabouts filings is accurate and sufficient in detail to enable any relevant Anti-Doping Organization to locate him for testing on any given day in that period of time. This is the most invasive testing programme in the history of any sport, but the UCI feels this invasion of privacy is justified as previously implemented anti-doping regimes have failed to detect every doping violation.

Cyclists sanctioned on basis of biological passports 
The biological passport programme has allowed the UCI to sanction riders for committing an anti-doping rule violation. Riders have also been targeted with further doping controls based on their biological passport.

During the first three years of UCI's bio passport program 26 riders were found positive for EPO. In 20 out of the 26 cases, it was the abnormal blood profile which raised suspicions leading to a targeted doping test.

Manuel Beltrán (Liquigas) tested positive for EPO at the 2008 Tour de France in a targeted test after anomalies appeared in a blood sample taken at the start of the Tour. The pre Tour blood samples were collected by the French Anti-doping Agency (AFLD) and the results from the testings were submitted to the UCI to form part of their database of profiles for their biological passport programme.
Gabriele Bosisio (LPR Brakes-Ballan) tested positive for EPO in an out-of-competition control in September 2010, after having been targeted under the biological passport programme. He received a two-year sanction.
Antonio Colom (Team Katusha) tested positive for EPO in an out-of-competition control in April 2009, after having been targeted under the biological passport programme. He received a two-year sanction.
Thomas Dekker (Rabobank) tested positive for EPO in a retroactive test carried out on a urine sample taken in December 2007. Dekker's hematological profile led the UCI to review the EPO analyses for urine samples conducted since the introduction of the biological passport programme.
Danilo Di Luca (LPR Brakes-Ballan) tested positive for CERA twice during the 2009 Giro d'Italia after being targeted under the biological passport programme.
Alberto Fernández de la Puebla (Fuji–Servetto) tested positive for EPO in an out-of-competition control in October 2009, after having been targeted under the biological passport programme. He received a two-year sanction.
David George (MTB) tested positive for EPO in an out-of-competition control 29 August 2012, after having been targeted under the biological passport programme of the South African Institute for Drug-Free Sport (the South African national Anti-doping agency). He admitted to having used EPO and received a two-year sanction.
Massimo Giunti (Androni Giocattoli) tested positive for EPO in an out-of-competition control in February 2010, after having been targeted under the biological passport programme. He received a two-year sanction.
Eddy Ratti (De Rosa-Stac Plastic) tested positive for EPO in an out-of-competition control in January 2010, after having been targeted under the biological passport programme. He received a two-year sanction.
Manuel Vázquez Hueso (Andalucía-Cajasur) tested positive for EPO in an out-of-competition control in March 2010, after having been targeted under the biological passport programme. He received a two-year sanction.

Athletics 
The International Association of Athletics Federations introduced their Athletes Biological Passport programme in 2009, and they announced the first sanction under the passport in May 2012. The Portuguese marathon runner Hélder Ornelas became the first track and field athlete to get suspended for doping based on the biological passport. He received a four-year suspension in May 2012.

Track and field athletes sanctioned on basis of biological passports 

In March 2014 the Spanish athletics federation cleared Marta Dominguez in a bio passport case. El País reported that IAAF were going to take the case to CAS.
In February 2014 IAAF announced they would appeal Aslı Çakır Alptekins ABP related doping case to CAS after the Turkish federation had cleared her. IAAF also suspended her provisionally. An IAAF spokesperson in January 2015 confirmed that Russian race walker Sergey Bakulin was provisionally suspended since December 2012 in an ABP related doping case. IAAF otherwise doesn't publicly announce provisional suspensions. In February 2015 Turkish press reported that Ümmü Kiraz, Bahar Doğan, Semiha Mutlu and Meliz Redif were under investigation in bio passport cases.

Triathlon 
In 2012 USADA sanctioned the American triathlete Mark Fretta "after variations in his individual longitudinal blood profile as well as other documentary evidence indicated the use of Erythropoiesis-Stimulating Agents". Fretta received a four-year ban, and his results from 18 August 2010 onwards were annulled.

Football (soccer) 
In 2014, the biological passport was introduced in the 2014 FIFA World Cup; blood and urine samples from all players before the competition and from two players per team and per match were analysed by the Swiss Laboratory for Doping Analyses.

Notes

References

External links 
 WADA: Athletes biological passport resources

Doping in sport